Jarren Williams (born July 18, 1997) is an American football cornerback for the Detroit Lions of the National Football League (NFL). He was signed as an undrafted free agent in 2020 by the Arizona Cardinals following his college football career with the Albany Great Danes.

Professional career

Arizona Cardinals
Williams was signed by the Arizona Cardinals as an undrafted free agent following the 2020 NFL Draft on April 27, 2020. He was waived on July 26, 2020.

New York Giants
Williams signed with the New York Giants on August 2, 2020. He was waived during final roster cuts on September 5, 2020, and signed to the team's practice squad the next day. He was elevated to the active roster on December 12 and 19 for the team's weeks 14 and 15 games against the Arizona Cardinals and Cleveland Browns, and reverted to the practice squad after each game. He signed a reserve/futures contract with the Giants on January 4, 2021.

Williams was placed on injured reserve on August 17, 2021. He was waived on August 21. He was re-signed to the practice squad on September 27. On December 4, 2021, Williams was elevated from the practice squad for the game against the Miami Dolphins. On December 11, 2021, Williams was elevated from the practice squad for the game against the Los Angeles Chargers. On December 18, 2021, Williams was activated from the practice squad as a COVID-19 replacement for the game against the Dallas Cowboys. On December 20, 2021, Williams was promoted to the active roster.

On March 16, 2022, Williams re-signed with the Giants. He was waived/injured on August 1, 2022 and placed on injured reserve. On August 5, 2022, Williams was waived off injured reserve on a injury settlement.

Detroit Lions
On November 29, 2022, Williams was signed to the Detroit Lions practice squad. He signed a reserve/future contract on January 9, 2023.

References

External links
Albany Great Danes football bio

1997 births
Living people
Albany Great Danes football players
American football cornerbacks
Arizona Cardinals players
Detroit Lions players
New York Giants players
People from Lewis Center, Ohio
Players of American football from Ohio
African-American players of American football